Gevrai or Georai is a tehsil in the Beed district of Maharashtra, India.

Geography
Gevrai is located at the coordinates , and has an average elevation of 465 metres (1528 feet).

It lies on National Highway 211 which connects Solapur – Osmanabad – Beed – Aurangabad – Dhule in Maharashtra, as well as National Highway 222 connecting Vishakhapatnam – Kalyan.

Demographics
As of the 2011 Census of India, Gevrai had a population of 80,423 with males constituting 52% of the population and females constituting 48%. Gevrai has an average literacy rate of 67%, which is higher than the national average of 59.5%. Total male literacy is 76%, while female literacy is at 58%. 14% of the population is under 6 years of age.

Education
 Shiv Sharda Public School
 St Xaviers school
 New Era Public School
 New Era International School
 New Era Junior College
 New Era Kota Pattern Classes
 New Era Pre-Primary School
 R. B. Attal College of Arts, Science and Commerce
 Sharda Vidya Mandir, Takadgaon Road
 New High School
 Vimla Vidya Mandir
 Z. P. High School
 Asharam School
 Anmol Balak Mandir
 Mahatma Phule Vidyalaya
Rk public school<ref
name=":4"></ref>

Politics
In recent history, the political scene in Gevrai has been dominated by Shivajirao Pandit, his cousin Badamrao Pandit, and Shivajio's eldest son, Amarsingh Pandit. The current MLA for the Gevrai Vidhan Sabha constituency is BJP's Adv. Laxman Pawar who belongs to the Patil family (historically, the traditional heads of Gevrai). He won the 2014 Vidhan Sabha election by defeating NCP's Badamrao Pandit in a landslide of 60001 votes - the highest winning margin in the Marathwada region. Amarsingh Pandit currently represents Gevrai as an MLC. In the recent Municipal elections, the BJP won 18 of the 19 seats and also the President of Municipality's position, further consolidating the position of MLA Laxman Pawar in the town.

See also
 Georai (Vidhan Sabha constituency)
 Beed (Lok Sabha constituency)

References 

Cities and towns in Beed district
Talukas in Maharashtra
Talukas in Beed district
Beed district